Jamie Taylor (born 11 January 1977) is a former English  footballer who played as a midfielder.

References

1977 births
Living people
English footballers
Association football midfielders
Rochdale A.F.C. players
English Football League players